Viveka Davis (born August 19, 1969) is an American actress who has starred in television series and films. As a young actress, she was best known for her role in the 1983 NBC TV miniseries V as Polly Maxwell, a role she reprised in the 1984 sequel V: The Final Battle.

Career 
Davis's first film role was in the 1982 drama film Shoot the Moon, playing the daughter of Albert Finney and Diane Keaton. As a teen, her best-known film role was in the 1987 comedy Morgan Stewart's Coming Home which she starred with Jon Cryer.

At age 16, she starred in dual roles in Disney's 1987 TV film Student Exchange. In 1995, she starred as country singing legend Wynonna Judd in NBC TV miniseries Naomi & Wynonna: Love Can Build a Bridge.

She has made guest appearances on TV series, including Knots Landing, Seinfeld, ER, Nash Bridges, Strong Medicine, and Touched by an Angel.

Filmography

References

External links 

1969 births
20th-century American actresses
21st-century American actresses
Actresses from Santa Monica, California
American film actresses
American television actresses
Living people